Biophotons (from the Greek βίος meaning "life" and φῶς meaning "light") are photons of light in the ultraviolet and low visible light range that are produced by a biological system.  They are non-thermal in origin, and the emission of biophotons is technically a type of bioluminescence, though  bioluminescence is  generally reserved for higher luminance luciferin/luciferase systems. The term biophoton used in this narrow sense should not be confused with the broader field of biophotonics, which studies the general interaction of light with biological systems.

Biological tissues typically produce an observed radiant emittance in the visible and ultraviolet frequencies ranging from 10−17 to 10−23 W/cm2 (approx 1-1000 photons/cm2/second). This low level of light has a much weaker intensity than the visible light produced by bioluminescence, but biophotons are detectable above the background of thermal radiation that is emitted by tissues at their normal temperature.

While detection of biophotons has been reported by several groups, hypotheses that such biophotons indicate the state of biological tissues and facilitate a form of cellular communication are still under investigation,  Alexander Gurwitsch, who discovered the existence of biophotons, was awarded the Stalin Prize in 1941 for his work.

Detection and measurement
Biophotons may be detected with photomultipliers or by means of an ultra low noise CCD camera to produce an image, using an exposure time of typically 15 minutes for plant materials. Photomultiplier tubes have been used to measure biophoton emissions from fish eggs, and some applications have measured biophotons from animals and humans. Electron Multiplying CCD (EM-CCD) optimized for the detection of ultraweak light have also been used to detect the bioluminescence produced by yeast cells at the onset of their growth.

The typical observed radiant emittance of biological tissues in the visible and ultraviolet frequencies ranges from 10−17 to 10−23 W/cm2 with a photon count from a few to nearly 1000 photons per cm2 in the range of 200 nm to 800 nm.

Proposed physical mechanisms 

Chemi-excitation via oxidative stress by reactive oxygen species and/or catalysis by enzymes (i.e., peroxidase, lipoxygenase) is a common event in the biomolecular milieu. Such reactions can lead to the formation of triplet excited species, which release photons upon returning to a lower energy level in a process analogous to phosphorescence. That this process is a contributing factor to spontaneous biophoton emission has been indicated by studies demonstrating that biophoton emission can be increased by depleting assayed tissue of antioxidants or by addition of carbonyl derivatizing agents. Further support is provided by studies indicating that emission can be increased by addition of reactive oxygen species.

Plants
Imaging of biophotons from leaves has been used as a method for assaying R gene responses. These genes and their associated proteins are responsible for pathogen recognition and activation of defense signaling networks leading to the hypersensitive response, which is one of the mechanisms of the resistance of plants to pathogen infection. It involves the generation of reactive oxygen species (ROS), which have crucial roles in signal transduction or as toxic agents leading to cell death.

Biophotons have been also observed in the roots of stressed plants. In healthy cells, the concentration of ROS is minimized by a system of biological antioxidants. However, heat shock and other stresses changes the equilibrium between oxidative stress and antioxidant activity, for example, the rapid rise in temperature induces biophoton emission by ROS.

Hypothesized involvement in cellular communication
In the 1920s, the Russian embryologist Alexander Gurwitsch reported "ultraweak" photon emissions from living tissues in the UV-range of the spectrum. He named them "mitogenetic rays" because his experiments convinced him that they had a stimulating effect on cell division.

In the 1970s Fritz-Albert Popp and his research group at the University of Marburg (Germany) showed that the spectral distribution of the emission fell over a wide range of wavelengths, from 200 to 750 nm.  Popp's work on the biophoton emission's statistical properties, namely the claims on its coherence, was criticised for lack of scientific rigour.

One biophoton mechanism focuses on injured cells that are under higher levels of oxidative stress, which is one source of light, and can be deemed to constitute a "distress signal" or background chemical process, but this mechanism is yet to be demonstrated. The difficulty of teasing out the effects of any supposed biophotons amid the other numerous chemical interactions between cells makes it difficult to devise a testable hypothesis. A 2010 review article discusses various published theories on this kind of signaling.

The hypothesis of cellular communication by biophotons was highly criticised for failing to explain how could cells detect photonic signals several orders of magnitude weaker than the natural background illumination.

See also 
Chemiluminescence
Luminophore
Phosphorescence

References

Further reading

External links 
 
 

Bioluminescence
Photons